Cokato is a city in Wright County, Minnesota, United States. The population was 2,799 at the 2020 census.

History
Cokato was founded in 1869 when the First Division of the St. Paul & Pacific Railroad was extended to that point. The city was named after a Siouan word meaning "amid". Cokato was incorporated as a village in 1878.

Geography

Demographics

2010 census
As of the census of 2010, there were 2,694 people in 1,000 households, including 652 families, in the city. The racial makeup of the city was 95.0% White, 0.3% African American, 0.5% Native American, 0.5% Asian, 2.3% from other races, and 1.4% from two or more races. Hispanic or Latino of any race were 4.3%.

Of the 1,000 households 36.9% had children under the age of 18 living with them, 50.4% were married couples living together, 10.7% had a female householder with no husband present, 4.1% had a male householder with no wife present, and 34.8% were non-families. 30.1% of households were one person and 15.5% were one person aged 65 or older. The average household size was 2.61 and the average family size was 3.29.

The median age was 32.5 years. 31.8% of residents were under the age of 18; 6.9% were between the ages of 18 and 24; 25.6% were from 25 to 44; 20.6% were from 45 to 64; and 15.2% were 65 or older. The gender makeup of the city was 48.4% male and 51.6% female.

2000 census
As of the census of 2000, there were 2,727 people in 990 households, including 663 families, in the city. The racial makeup of the city was 96.81% White, 0.15% African American, 0.26% Native American, 0.44% Asian, 0.04% Pacific Islander, 1.25% from other races, and 1.06% from two or more races. Hispanic or Latino of any race were 2.68%. 29.5% were of German, 24.2% Finnish, 15.3% Swedish and 9.8% Norwegian ancestry.

Of the 990 households 36.6% had children under the age of 18 living with them, 51.1% were married couples living together, 11.2% had a female householder with no husband present, and 33.0% were non-families. 29.7% of households were one person and 17.0% were one person aged 65 or older.  The average household size was 2.66 and the average family size was 3.33.

The age distribution was 31.8% under the age of 18, 8.4% from 18 to 24, 25.4% from 25 to 44, 16.9% from 45 to 64, and 17.5% 65 or older. The median age was 33 years. For every 100 females, there were 91.5 males. For every 100 females age 18 and over, there were 90.3 males.

The median household income was $39,613 and the median family income was $51,645. Males had a median income of $35,362 versus $21,484 for females. The per capita income for the city was $17,149. About 7.1% of families and 7.7% of the population were below the poverty line, including 7.5% of those under age 18 and 14.9% of those age 65 or over.

Arts and culture
Cokato is home to the Cokato Museum & Gust Akerlund Studio. The museum is a local history museum chronicling the story of the people of Cokato and the surrounding townships in southwest Wright County. The Akerlund Studio is a restored photography studio, and home of Gust Akerlund, who operated it during the early 20th century.

Since 1950, Cokato has hosted the Cokato Corn Carnival annually during the second week of August in Peterson Park, near Cokato Elementary School. The festival's highlight is the serving of free corn-on-the-cob, along with a parade, midway and carnival rides, musical entertainment, the Miss Cokato coronation, and other events.

The Aho family of Cokato was featured by journalist Steve Hartman on CBS News Sunday Morning on December 9, 2012, for having 12 sons who all played football at the local high school over more than two decades.

Government

{| align="center" border="2" cellpadding="4" cellspacing="0" style="float:right; margin: 1em 1em 1em 0; border: 1px #aaa solid; border-collapse: collapse; font-size: 95%;"

|+ 2020 Precinct Results Spreadsheet
|+ 2016 Precinct Results Spreadsheet
|+ 2012 Precinct Results Spreadsheet
|+ 2008 Precinct Results Spreadsheet
|+ 2004 Precinct Results Spreadsheet
|+ 2000 Precinct Results Spreadsheet
|+ 1996 Precinct Results
|+ 1992 Precinct Results
|+ 1988 Precinct Results
|+ 1984 Precinct Results
|+ 1980 Precinct Results
|+ 1976 Precinct Results
|+ 1968 Precinct Results
|+ 1964 Precinct Results
|+ 1960 Precinct Results
|- bgcolor=lightgrey
! Year
! Republican
! Democratic
! Third parties
|-
|  style="text-align:center;" |2020
|  style="text-align:center;" |68.7% 1,002
|  style="text-align:center;" |28.9% 421
|  style="text-align:center; background:honeyDew;"|2.4% 36
|-
|  style="text-align:center;" |2016
|  style="text-align:center;" |63.4% 857
|  style="text-align:center;" |26.2% 354
|  style="text-align:center; background:honeyDew;"|10.4% 140
|-
|  style="text-align:center;" |2012
|  style="text-align:center;" |58.2% 784
|  style="text-align:center;" |38.3% 516
|  style="text-align:center; background:honeyDew;"|3.5% 48
|-
|  style="text-align:center;" |2008
|  style="text-align:center;" |60.1% 827
|  style="text-align:center;" |36.4% 501
|  style="text-align:center; background:honeyDew;"|3.5% 49
|-
|  style="text-align:center;" |2004
|  style="text-align:center;" |62.2% 863
|  style="text-align:center;" |35.1% 487
|  style="text-align:center; background:honeyDew;"|2.7% 37
|-
|  style="text-align:center;" |2000
|  style="text-align:center;" |58.6% 776
|  style="text-align:center;" |35.3% 467
|  style="text-align:center; background:honeyDew;"|6.1% 81
|-
|  style="text-align:center;" |1996
|  style="text-align:center;" |44.2% 527
|  style="text-align:center;" |43.5% 518
|  style="text-align:center; background:honeyDew;"|12.3% 146
|-
|  style="text-align:center;" |1992
|  style="text-align:center;" |39.2% 479
|  style="text-align:center;" |35.9% 438
|  style="text-align:center; background:honeyDew;"|24.9% 304
|-
|  style="text-align:center;" |1988
|  style="text-align:center;" |55.1% 593
|  style="text-align:center;" |44.9% 484
|  style="text-align:center; background:honeyDew;"|0.0% 0
|-
|  style="text-align:center;" |1984
|  style="text-align:center;" |58.4% 635
|  style="text-align:center;" |41.6% 452
|  style="text-align:center; background:honeyDew;"|0.0% 0
|-
|  style="text-align:center;" |1980
|  style="text-align:center;" |51.4% 563
|  style="text-align:center;" |41.6% 455'
|  style="text-align:center; background:honeyDew;"|7.0% 77|-
|  style="text-align:center;" |1976
|  style="text-align:center;" |54.5% 568|  style="text-align:center;" |43.1% 449|  style="text-align:center; background:honeyDew;"|2.4% 25|-
|  style="text-align:center;" |1968
|  style="text-align:center;" |54.5% 472|  style="text-align:center;" |43.8% 379|  style="text-align:center; background:honeyDew;"|1.7% 15|-
|  style="text-align:center;" |1964
|  style="text-align:center;" |52.2% 405|  style="text-align:center;" |47.8% 371|  style="text-align:center; background:honeyDew;"|0.0% 0|-
|  style="text-align:center;" |1960
|  style="text-align:center;" |73.2% 569|  style="text-align:center;" |26.5% 206|  style="text-align:center; background:honeyDew;"|0.3% 2|}

 Education 
Cokato is part of the Dassel-Cokato School District, ISD #466.

Infrastructure
U.S. Highway 12 serves as a main route in the city. The BNSF Railway serves the community as a part of the Wayzata Subdivision.

Notable people

 Sydney Eckman Ahlstrom – university professor and historian of American religion. Graduate of Gustavus Adolphus College (B.A., 1941), the University of Minnesota (M.A., 1946), and Harvard University (Ph.D., 1952). Joined the history faculty of Yale University in 1954, where he taught until his retirement in 1984. In 1972 he published A Religious History of the American People; this landmark study won the National Book Award for Philosophy and Religion in 1973. Made a fellow of the American Academy of Arts and Sciences in 1978. Born in Cokato 1919; Cokato High School class of 1937.
 David Bromstad – interior designer and television personality. In 2006 he won the first season of HGTV Design Star. He is the host of Color Splash with David Bromstad, which debuted in 2007 on HGTV. He has also hosted HGTV's Color Splash Miami and My Lottery Dream Home''. Born in Cokato 1973.
 George August Borg - businessman and Minnesota state legislator
 Steve Knapp – driver on the USF2000 and IndyCar circuits. USF2000 season champion in 1996. Competed in the Indianapolis 500 from 1998 to 2000. As one of only three drivers to complete all 200 laps of the 1998 Indianapolis 500, Knapp finished behind only Eddie Cheever and Buddy Lazier and won rookie of the year. Owns and operates Elite Engines, designer and manufacturer of customized racing power plants, in West Bend, WI. Cokato High School class of 1982.

References

External links
 
 City of Cokato Minnesota

Cities in Minnesota
Cities in Wright County, Minnesota
Populated places established in 1869
1869 establishments in Minnesota